is a video game for the PlayStation 2 created by Masaya Matsuura and his studio NanaOn-Sha. It is the sequel to the 1999 PlayStation game Vib-Ribbon. It was released in Japan in 2004.

Vib-Ripple is notable for allowing the player to import photographs to be used as the game's playing field.

Gameplay
The player takes control of Vibri, a simple, vector-shaped rabbit from the game's predecessor Vib-Ribbon. The game puts the player on top of various photographs, using each one as a trampoline. Jumping on a photograph loosens up 2D items called "Peta Characters", which Vibri must collect before a time limit expires. An icon on the left side of the screen gives the player a hint as to what part of the photograph to jump on to find the item; the icon's color, shape, and size corresponds to a certain combination of the three on the photograph. When Vibri is close enough to the item, a drumming sound is made and the controller vibrates. Vibri must also avoid creatures called "Boonchies" that inhabit the surface of the picture. Coming in contact with a Boonchie will cause Vibri to de-evolve from a rabbit, to a frog, to a worm, and eventually cause a game over. However, it is possible for Vibri to evolve into a form called "Super Vibri", allowing the player to temporarily disable a Boonchie, as well as see hidden Peta Characters.

Vib-Ripple has 60 default photographs. The player can create their own stages by uploading their own photographs from a digital camera or cellphone via the PlayStation 2's USB port, or even send pictures across the system's online network. The game automatically scales photographs down to 200 by 200 pixels.

See also
Mojib-Ribbon

References

External links

2004 video games
Japan-exclusive video games
Action video games
Photography games
PlayStation 2 games
PlayStation 2-only games
Sony Interactive Entertainment games
Video game sequels
Video games about evolution
Video games about rabbits and hares
Video games developed in Japan
Single-player video games
Rhythm games
NanaOn-Sha games